Port Victor may refer to:

Ships

Places 

 Victor Harbor, South Australia, previously known as Port Victor 
Victor Port, Gujarat, India